Waimea River may refer to

Hawaii
 Waimea River (Kauai) on the island of Kauai 
 Waimea River (Oahu) on the island of Oahu

New Zealand
Waimea River (Southland) in the south of the South Island
Waimea River (Tasman) in the north of the South Island